Brickellia diffusa is a Latin American species of flowering plants in the family Asteraceae. It is widespread across much of South America, Central America, Mexico, Galápagos, and the West Indies (Cuba, Trinidad, Hispaniola, etc.). Its distribution stretches from Sonora and Tamaulipas in northern Mexico to Jujuy in northern Argentina.

References

External links
Line drawing from Flora of Panama
Photo taken in Bolivia
Photo taken in Nicaragua
Photo of herbarium specimen at Missouri Botanical Garden, collected in Perú
Photo of herbarium specimen at Missouri Botanical Garden, collected in Chiapas in southern Mexico

diffusa
Flora of Mexico
Flora of South America
Flora of the Caribbean
Flora of Central America
Plants described in 1838
Flora without expected TNC conservation status